The CERH Women's Euro 2013 or 2013 CERH Women's Championship was the 12th edition of the CERH European Women's Roller Hockey Championship, held between 17 and 21 December, in Mieres, Asturias, Spain.

The tournament was initially dated for 9 to 14 September, but was suspended as there were not at least five teams.

Round-robin Stage

Standings

Games 
1st round - 17 December 2013

2nd Round - 18 December 2013

3rd Round - 19 December 2013

Championship knock-out 
{{Round4-with third

|20-Dec-2013 - 20:00 (CET)|  | 4 |  | 1
|20-Dec-2013 - 21:15 (CET)|  | 7 |  | 1

|21-Dec-2013 - 19:45 (CET)|  | 7 |   | 0

|21-Dec-2013 - 18:30 (CET)|  | 5 |  | 0
}}

GamesSemi-finals - 20 December 20133rd PlaceFinal'''

Final ranking

References 

Notícia RFEP
Calendário Oficial

External links
World's rink-hockey biggest website
Comité Européen de Rink-Hockey CERH website

European Women's Roller Hockey Championship
European Championship
2013 in Spanish women's sport
International roller hockey competitions hosted by Spain
Euro